XHBTS-FM is a radio station on 96.5 FM in Bahía de Tortugas, Baja California Sur.

History
XEBTS-AM 1310 received its concession on May 8, 1995. It migrated to FM in 2011.

References

Radio stations in Baja California Sur
Radio stations established in 1995